Danger! is the first EP by Swedish duo The Sound of Arrows. Danger! was available for free digital download from the site of the record company.

The Sound of Arrows are starting out totally unknown so they’ve only brought in friends this time. Cotton Crew, Panache and Mr Pedro go for the electro-pumping sound. The version by Ice Cream Shout instead takes the route of super-mega twee. Complete with ukuleles and toypianos.

Track listings

Personnel 

 The Sound of Arrows — lyrics, music, production, design and layout of artwork
 One Size Fits All — logo of artwork
 Linus Kullman — painting of artwork
 Björn Baummann — bass (tracks: 2)

References

2008 debut EPs
The Sound of Arrows albums